Fusarium oxysporum f.sp. coffea is a fungal plant pathogen infecting coffee.

References

External links
 Index Fungorum
 USDA ARS Fungal Database

oxysporum f.sp. coffea
Fungal plant pathogens and diseases
Coffee diseases
Forma specialis taxa